Nina Kost (born 17 April 1995) is a Swiss swimmer. She competed in the women's 50 metre freestyle and women's 100 metre backstroke events at the 2019 World Aquatics Championships held in Gwangju, South Korea. In both events she did not advance to compete in the semi-finals. She also competed in two women's relay events, without winning a medal.

References

External links
 

1995 births
Living people
Swiss female backstroke swimmers
Place of birth missing (living people)
Swiss female freestyle swimmers
20th-century Swiss women
21st-century Swiss women